A Society Exile (1919) is an American silent film drama directed by George Fitzmaurice and starring Elsie Ferguson, Julia Dean, and William Carleton. The assistant director to Fitzmaurice was William Scully. The film marks the second screen appearance of the actor Henry Stephenson. The film was based upon the play We Can't Be as Bad as All That by Henry Arthur Jones.

According to the American Film Institute catalog, William Cameron Menzies may or may not have been the art director for the film.

Plot
Based upon a plot summary included in a film review in a film publication, Nora (Ferguson) is an American heiress who is courted by Lord Bissett (Gamble) while visiting England. She overhears Bissett discussing with his sister the need of Nora's money to replenish his fortune, so she leaves him and moves into a nearby
cottage. A successful playwright Sir Howard Furnival (Stephenson) assists her in preparing a play based upon a novel she has written, but keeps this secret from his wife Doris (Dean), who is very jealous. Bissett obtains a page of the manuscript in Nora's handwriting with enduring terms, and gives it to Doris, telling her that it is a love letter to her husband. This leads to the deaths of both Furnivals, and Nora is blamed and ostracized. Nora changes her name and goes to Venice, where she meets and becomes engaged to English army officer Sir Ralph Newell (Carleton). Before their marriage she confesses who she is in a letter that he never receives. Upon return to England, she discovers that her husband is the brother of Doris and has cursed the woman who caused his sister's death. Bissett reveals to Newell who Nora is. In the end after more melodrama, the lovers are reunited in Venice.

Cast

Preservation status
It is not known whether the film currently survives, and it is likely a lost film.

See also
List of lost films

References

External links

 
A Society Exile at AllMovie
Period newspaper ad for the film

1919 films
American silent feature films
1919 drama films
Lost American films
Films directed by George Fitzmaurice
Films set in England
Films set in London
American black-and-white films
Films with screenplays by Ouida Bergère
Silent American drama films
1919 lost films
Lost drama films
1910s American films